The Matthews House near Danburg, Georgia, located northeast on Georgia State Route 79, was built in 1855.  It was listed on the National Register of Historic Places in 1976.

The listing included four contributing buildings.

It is a Gothic Revival-style frame building with a two-story five-bay portico supported by six fluted Doric columns.

References

Houses on the National Register of Historic Places in Georgia (U.S. state)
Gothic Revival architecture in Georgia (U.S. state)
Houses completed in 1855
Lincoln County, Georgia